Statesmen of Comedy was a half-hour comedy panel show hosted by Trevor Marmalade. Trevor talks with Australia’s finest comedians, not only about the skills of their trade, but also provides a range of off-the-wall topics inviting them to flex their comedy muscles.

Episodes

Season 1 (2010-2011)
 Episode 1 - Features: Shane Bourne, Jane Kennedy, Tim Smith
 Episode 2 - Features: Glenn Robbins, Greg Fleet, Jason Stevens
 Episode 3 - Features: Peter Rowsthorn, Jeff Stilson, Greg Fleet
 Episode 4 - Features: Red Symons, Wilbur Wilde, Brian Nankervis
 Episode 5 - Features: Jeff Green, Colin Lane, Russell Gilbert
 Episode 6 - Features: Steve Vizard, Andrew Goodone, Tim Smith
 Episode 7 - Features: Vince Sorrenti, Elliot Goblet, Tim Smith
 Episode 8 - Features: Russell Gilbert, Matthew Quartermaine, Jimeoin
 Episode 9 - Features: Shane Bourne, Jeff Stilson, Glenn Robbins
 Episode 10 - Features: Matt Parkinson, Anthony Morgan, Greg Fleet
 Episode 11 - Features: Paul Calleja, Cal Wilson, Dave O'Neil
 Episode 12 - Features: Peter Rowsthorn, Rachel Berger, Anthony Morgan
 Episode 13 - Unscreened Highlights Part 1 Special
 Episode 14 - Unscreened Highlights Part 2 Special
 Episode 15 - The Very Best Of Special

References

External links 
 

Australian television talk shows
2010 Australian television series debuts
The Comedy Channel original programming